A Wind in the Door is a young adult science fantasy novel by Madeleine L'Engle. It is a companion book to A Wrinkle in Time and part of the Time Quintet.

Plot summary
14-year-old Meg Murry is worried about her brother Charles Wallace, a 6-year-old genius bullied at school by the other children. The new principal of the elementary school is the former high school principal, Mr. Jenkins, who often disciplined Meg, and Meg is sure has a grudge against her whole family. Meg tries to enlist Jenkins's help in protecting her brother but is unsuccessful. Later, Meg discovers that Charles Wallace has a progressive disease that is leaving him short of breath. Their mother, a microbiologist, suspects it may be a disorder of his mitochondria and his mitochondria's farandolae. (The farandolae are micro-organelles inside mitochondria that exist in the Time Quintet fantasy universe.)

One afternoon, Charles Wallace tells Meg of a "drive of dragons" in their backyard, where he and Meg thereupon discover a pile of unusual feathers. Later, Meg has a frightening encounter with a monstrous facsimile of Mr. Jenkins. That night, Meg, Charles Wallace, and their friend, 16-year-old Calvin O'Keefe discover that Charles Wallace's "drive of dragons" is an extraterrestrial "cherubim" named Proginoskes (nicknamed 'Progo' by Meg), under the tutelage of the immense humanoid Blajeny, who recruits the three children to counteract the Echthroi.

Meg's first task, on the next day, is to distinguish the real Mr. Jenkins from two Echthroi doubles, by identification of the (potential) goodness in him despite her personal grudge. The protagonists then learn that Echthroi are destroying Charles Wallace's farandolae, and travel inside one of his mitochondria, to persuade a larval farandola, named Sporos, to accept its role as a mature fara, against the urgings of an Echthros. In the process, Meg is nearly annihilated, and Mr. Jenkins is invaded by his Echthros doubles; whereafter Proginoskes sacrifices himself to "fill in" the emptiness of the Echthroi, and Charles Wallace is saved.

Characters
Meg Murry is a high school student, a defensive misfit who gets along best with her family and her friend Calvin O'Keefe. She wears glasses, has brown hair, and initially considers herself "repulsive-looking" and "dumb", although she is quite good at math. By the time of A Wind in the Door, Meg is much happier in school than previously, in part because of her friendship with Calvin, but is deeply worried about Charles Wallace. In "naming" Mr. Jenkins, Meg learns to love and appreciate someone she has always resented. In the course of the story Meg also learns to "kythe" with Calvin, Proginoskes, and others, communing with them essentially by telepathy.

Charles Wallace Murry is noted as being extremely intelligent, wise, and telepathic. He is something "new" and "different," biologically and "in essence" according to his mother. He is usually the first to discover certain elements important to the books, including the singular cherubim Proginoskes. Charles Wallace is bullied by fellow children and misunderstood by adults outside his family. He recognizes that this is a problem he must solve himself; that like any new lifeform, he must learn to adapt successfully to his environment in order to survive. Charles has blue eyes, and is said to be small for his age. His mitochondritis is life-threatening.  

Calvin O'Keefe tall, orange hair, freckles and blue eyes, and is a popular boy on the basketball team. As of A Wind in the Door, he is already a high school senior at the age of fifteen, and class president. However, he did not feel that anyone understands or cares about him until he became friends with the Murry family. He is the third eldest child of Paddy and Branwen O'Keefe, who have eleven children and are seemingly neglectful of all of them. Calvin considers himself a biological "sport" and different from the rest of his family. Being poor, the O'Keefes are unable to afford new clothes to accommodate Calvin's growth spurts, and he often wears clothes that are too short for him. Throughout ‘The Time Quintet’, Calvin grows in affection and friendship with the Murry family, especially Charles Wallace and Meg, although it is strongest with the latter. 

Mr. Jenkins, another character from A Wrinkle in Time, is further developed in Wind. Formerly the high school principal, Mr. Jenkins has become the principal of Charles Wallace's elementary school instead, an apparent demotion. He is described as having dandruff, thinning mouse-brown hair and smelling of "old hair cream.” Meg initially thinks of him as a failure and an obstacle, only to be surprised by his efforts to help when he finally understands the situation. 

Proginoskes, is a "singular cherubim" Seraph; he becomes a particular friend of Meg's. "Progo" has what seems like hundreds of constantly moving wings, a great quantity and variety of eyes (which Meg seems to travel through at some points in the book), and "jets of flame" and smoke. He does not always take material form, and even when he does, as he tells Meg, not everyone is able to see him. Like Meg, Proginoskes is a Namer, and once learned the names of all the stars. The character's own name means "foreknowledge". He teaches and helps Meg kythe, which is a form of telepathy.

Major themes
Cosmic evil is connected with evil on a cellular level, and the children along with some new friends go within Charles Wallace in order to save his mitochondria (and the fictive entities living within them, the farandolae) from the un-namers—the Echthroi (the Ancient  Greek word for "enemies"). The Echthroi are powerful, evil creatures whose desire is to X (i.e. extinguish, unname) creation. Author Calvin Miller writes that the Echthroi are "demonic spirits" that "are always stalking good, making the whole sick, the entire partial, the holy eroded by the contaminated." The Echthroi reappear in A Swiftly Tilting Planet, trying to prevent Charles Wallace from reaching key moments in history in a bid to save the world from nuclear destruction.

Space and time hold little meaning within the Time Quintet series. In several instances, we find Meg and other characters frustrated with their new friends and confused about these concepts. However, according to the mythical creatures that are introduced, these concepts are limiting and unimportant. This is the key concept to understanding why Charles' sickness could be so important. His sickness, the ailment of his mitochondria, is just as important as the fate of a planet elsewhere in the universe because each part of creation, great or small, is important.

Like all of L'Engle's books, the power of love is again a force to be reckoned with as it helps save several characters—not just Charles Wallace but also Meg and a farandola named Sporos. Meg learns to see beyond superficial impressions, and appreciate and embrace inner beauty and strength. Much of the communication between characters in this book involves a process called "kything". This process is similar to telepathy and empathic abilities combined. Meg also learns that she is a Namer. Namers work in the universe to love and Name parts of Creation, and help them to be themselves. This is the exact opposite of what Echthroi do in their Xing or unNaming.

The premise of Naming and counting is inspired by passages in the Gospels of Matthew and Luke which say that God has numbered every hair on our heads and that God is aware of every sparrow that falls. In her book The Rock That Is Higher, L'Engle mentions this concept, and the interdependency that is at the heart of A Wind in the Door:

The title is based on a quote from Le Morte d'Arthur.

Story development
The novel grew out of a short story, "Intergalactic P.S. 3", first published as a pamphlet for Children's Book Week in 1970. In this early version of the narrative, Mrs Whatsit, Mrs Who and Mrs Which from A Wrinkle in Time send Charles Wallace, Meg and Calvin to a school on another planet, where Proginoskes and a conifer seed version of Sporos are among their classmates. As in the novel, Meg must identify the real Mr. Jenkins among his two impostors. If she fails, it will be "a victory for the Dark  Shadow" (i.e. the Black Thing).

In Walking on Water: Reflections on Faith and Art, L'Engle states that at one stage in the writing of A Wind in the Door, she knew who most of the characters would be, including Progo, the snake and "the three Mr. Jenkinses." She had difficulty developing the story, however, until a physician friend gave her two articles about mitochondria. "And there was where the story wanted me to go," L'Engle writes, "away from the macrocosm and into the microcosm." Enlisting the help of her elder daughter, she proceeded to give herself "a crash course in cellular biology," which she found to be hard work, but also a lot of fun.

Reception
At the time of the book's     publication, Kirkus Reviews said, "The audacity of Ms. L'Engle's mytho-scientific imagination and her undoubted storytelling abilities keep the reader involved in Meg's quest, but one wonders whether its chief appeal doesn't lie in the all too natural desire to believe that our difficulties, like the Murrys', are personal attacks by the forces of cosmic evil... Unfortunately, Meg learns to love the universe with unconvincing ease, and L'Engle seems to be straining unusually hard to relate what's wrong with America to the double-talk phenomenon of mitochondria and farandolae." Michele Murray wrote in The New York Times, "Madeleine L'Engle mixes classical theology, contemporary family life, and futuristic science fiction to make a completely convincing tale that should put under its spell both readers familiar with the Murrys and those meeting them for the first time." In a 2012 essay for Tor.com, American author and critic Mari Ness wrote, "This is L'Engle at the height of her poetic powers, and the failure of this book to receive the same attention and fame as its predecessor is a genuine shame."

Series notes
The characters Meg, Charles Wallace, and Calvin first appeared in A Wrinkle in Time (1962). Unlike some of the other books in the series, A Wind in the Door focuses on the same three protagonists. They and their families collectively appear in a total of eight books, four about the Murry family (the Time Quartet) and four about the eldest of the O'Keefe children a generation later. The Time Quartet plus the last of the O'Keefe books, An Acceptable Time, are marketed as the Time Quintet.

Audio adaptation
A Listening Library edition on four audio cassettes, unabridged and read by the author, was issued in 1994.   In January 2012, Listening Library released an audio CD version narrated by actress Jennifer Ehle.

See also
 Farandole

References

External links 
 L'Engle's Official Site
 A Wrinkle In Time Quintet Excerpts - A Wind in the Door 

American fantasy novels
1973 American novels
American young adult novels
American science fiction novels
Children's fantasy novels
Novels by Madeleine L'Engle
Time Quintet
1973 fantasy novels
1973 science fiction novels
Farrar, Straus and Giroux books
1973 children's books